in Kokurakita-ku is the main railway station in Kitakyushu, Japan. It is part of the JR Kyushu network and the San'yō Shinkansen stops here. It is the second largest station in Kyushu with 120,000 users daily. In the late 1990s, the Kokura station area was expanded and remodelled.

JR lines
 Kagoshima Main Line
 San'yō Shinkansen
 Nippō Main Line
 Hitahikosan Line

JR limited express trains
 San'yō Shinkansen Nozomi, Hikari, and Kodama ( -  - )
 San'yō Shinkansen Mizuho, and Sakura ( - ( by Kyushu Shinkansen)
 Sonic (Hakata - //)
 Nichirin Seagaia (Hakata - )
 Kirameki (Mojikō/Kokura - Hakata)

Monorail
 Kitakyushu Monorail

Tracks

History

 April 1, 1891: Opened by the private company Kyushu Tetsudo in front of Kokura Castle.
 July 1, 1907: Brought under state control.
 March 1, 1958: Reconstructed 700 meters east of original location (the former station site is now known as Nishi ("West")
Kokura). 
 March 10, 1975: Sanyo Shinkansen services commenced.
 April 1, 1987: Following privatisation of JNR it came under the control of JR Kyushu. The Shinkansen platforms are run by JR West.
 April 1, 1998: Kitakyushu Monorail line is extended to Kokura Station as part of a major reconstruction of the station building.

Passenger statistics
In fiscal 2016, the station was used by an average of 35,431 passengers daily (boarding passengers only), and it ranked 2nd among the busiest stations of JR Kyushu.

Surrounding area
Kokura Castle
Kitakyushu Stadium
West Japan General Exhibition Center
Kitakyushu International Conference Center

References

External links
Station Information (JR Kyushu) 

Railway stations in Fukuoka Prefecture
Buildings and structures in Kitakyushu
Sanyō Shinkansen
Railway stations in Japan opened in 1891